Ocice is a sparsely populated district, which was annexed by Tarnobrzeg in 1976. It is located in the outskirts of the town, and has a railroad junction station.

Districts of Tarnobrzeg